Geertruida is a Dutch feminine given name cognate to English Gertrude. It was a common name, but its use has declined steadily since about 1950. Bearers often used short forms in daily life, like Geertje, Troy, Trudy, Trui, and Truus. People with the name include:

Geertruida "Truus" Bauer (1945–1989), Dutch rower
Geertruida "Truid" Blaisse-Terwindt (1917–2002), Dutch tennis player
Geertruida Carelsen (1843–1938), Dutch author
Geertruida Bosboom-Toussaint  (1812–1866), Dutch novelist
Geertruida de Haas-Lorentz (1885–1973), Dutch physicist
Geertruida "Truida" Heil-Bonnet (1920–2014), Dutch gymnast
Geertruida "Truus" Hennipman (born 1943), Dutch sprinter
Geertruida "Truus" Klapwijk (1904–1991), Dutch freestyle swimmer
Geertruida "Truus" Looijs (born 1946), Dutch swimmer
Geertruida Middendorp (1911–2007), Dutch resistance member
Geertruida "Trudy" Ruth (born 1950), Dutch sprinter
Geertruida van Saksen (1033–1113), countess consort of Holland
Geertruida Wijsmuller-Meijer (1896–1978), Dutch war hero and resistance fighter
Gertruida van Veen (1602–1643), Flemish painter

Male 
Geertruida Maria "Ruud" Geels (born 1948), Dutch footballer

Other names 
 Geertruid Adriaansdochter (died 1573), Dutch farmer
 Geertruy Haeck, Dutch patrician woman
 Geertruydt Roghman (1625–1657), Dutch painter
 Gertruid Bolwater (died 1511), Dutch heroine

See also
1267 Geertruida, a main-belt asteroid
Geertruida Gerarda (1904 ship)

References

Dutch feminine given names